Dead in the Water may refer to:

 Dead in the Water (Woods novel), the third book in the Stone Barrington series by Stuart Woods
 Dead in the Water (Holder novel), by Nancy Holder
 Dead in the Water, a novel by Ann Granger
 Dead in the Water (1991 film), a 1991 made-for-TV film starring Bryan Brown and Teri Hatcher
 Dead in the Water (2002 film), a 2002 American thriller
 "Dead in the Water" (Midsomer Murders), an episode of the British television show Midsomer Murders
 "Dead in the Water" (Supernatural), an episode of the television series Supernatural
 Dead in the Water (video game)
 "Dead in the Water", a song by 10 Years from Feeding the Wolves
 "Dead in the Water", a song by Noel Gallagher's High Flying Birds from Who Built the Moon?
 "Dead in the Water", a song by Ellie Goulding from Halcyon
 "Dead in the Water", a song by David Gray from A New Day at Midnight
 "Dead in the Water", a song by Hawthorne Heights from If Only You Were Lonely 
 "Fear The Walking Dead: Dead in the Water", a web-series spin-off in The Walking Dead franchise.